Compline is a septet for flute, clarinet, harp, and string quartet by the American composer Christopher Rouse.  The work was commissioned by the Chamber Music Society of Lincoln Center through an award from the Koussevitzky Music Foundation.  It was first performed by the Chamber Music Society of Lincoln Center on December 6, 1996 at Alice Tully Hall in the Lincoln Center for the Performing Arts.  The piece is dedicated to the memory of Natalie and Serge Koussevitzky.

Composition
Compline is composed in four connected sections and has a duration of roughly 16 minutes.  It is scored for the same instrumentation as Maurice Ravel's Introduction and Allegro.

Style and inspiration
Rouse described the title and inspiration for Compline in the score program notes, writing:
He added, "Unlike the majority of other works I composed in the half dozen years before it, Compline does not concern itself with death but rather with light. In this it perhaps augurs a change in my musical outlook."

Reception
Bernard Holland of The New York Times called the piece "serious, skillful music" and wrote:
James C. Taylor of the Los Angeles Times called it "a dense work for seven instruments" with moments "that sneak up on one's ears and offer real delight."  Alan Rich of LA Weekly called the music "attractive" and compared the piece favorably to Ravel's Introduction and Allegro, writing, "Smart coattail riding, that, and smart music as well."

References

Compositions by Christopher Rouse
1996 compositions
Chamber music compositions
Commissioned music